String Quartet No. 2 (1954) is the second of six string quartets by the American composer Milton Babbitt.

Analysis
The form of this chamber composition evolves from and expounds features of a basic twelve-tone series. 

The pitch material is developed gradually in the opening bars. An interval of a rising minor third predominates in bars 1–3, followed by a concentration on falling major thirds in bars 4–6. The following bars continue in this way, presenting a single interval or pair of intervals, beneath which groupings defined by dynamics and register develop patterns suggested by these intervals, eventually involving all aspects of the musical structure. The quartet alternates such sections of intervallic exposition with sections that develop the intervals presented up to that point, until eleven different ordered pitch-class intervals have been presented and developed until, in a moment referred to by Babbitt as "telling you the butler did it", the set that controls the entire musical structure is revealed by a process of "disambiguation", as Babbitt himself described it.

Discography

 Ruth Crawford Seeger: String Quartet (1931); George Perle: String Quartet No. 5 (1960/67); Milton Babbitt: String Quartet No. 2 (1952 [sic, recte: 1954]). The Composers Quartet (Matthew Raimondi, Anahid Ajemian, violins; Jean Dupouy, viola; Michael Rudiakov, cello). LP recording, 12 inch, stereo. Nonesuch Records H-71280. New York: Nonesuch, 1973. Babbitt Quartet No. 2 reissued on CD as part of Milton Babbitt: Occasional Variations. Also with Babbitt: String Quartet No. 6; Composition for Guitar. Mark II Sound Synthesizer, realized by Milton Babbitt; The Composers Quartet (Matthew Raimondi, Anahid Ajemian, violins; Jean Dupouy, viola; Michael Rudiakov, cello); Fred Sherry String Quartet (Harumi Rhodes, Aaron Boyd, violins; James Myer Hogg, viola; Katherine Cherbas, cello); William Anderson, guitar. CD recording. Tzadik TZ 7088. New York: Tzadik, 2008.
 Richard Boulanger: Three Chapters from The Book of Dreams; Stephen Travis Pope: Bat out of Hell; Milton Babbitt: String Quartet No. 2 (selections); Stuart Dempster and William O. Smith: Outrage and Eye Music; Larry Solomon: The End of September and Casio Improvisation No. 1. János Négyesy (Mathews violin) and Lee Ray, electronics; Queen String Quartet; Stuart Dempster (trombone) and William O. Smith (clarinet). Cassette tape recording, stereo, accompanying Perspectives of New Music 24, no. 2. [Seattle] 1986.

References

Sources

Further reading

 Babbitt, Milton. 1976. "Responses: A First Approximation". Perspectives of New Music 14, no. 2/15, no. 1 (Sounds and Words. A Critical Celebration of Milton Babbitt at 60, Spring–Summer/Fall–Winter): 3–23.
 Barkin, Elaine, and Martin Brody. 2001. "Babbitt, Milton (Byron)". The New Grove Dictionary of Music and Musicians, second edition, edited by Stanley Sadie and John Tyrrell. London: Macmillan.
 Cohn, Richard. 1982. "The 12 × 12 Latin Square as Found in Babbitt's String Quartet No. 2". Sonus 3:57–65.
 Dubiel, Joseph. 1990. "Three Essays on Milton Babbitt" [Part 1]. Perspectives of New Music 28, no. 2 (Summer) 216–261.
 Dubiel, Joseph. 1992. "Three Essays on Milton Babbitt (Part Three)". Perspectives of New Music 30, no. 1 (Winter) 82–131.
 Mead, Andrew Washburn. 1994. An Introduction to the Music of Milton Babbitt. Princeton: Princeton University Press. .
 McLane, Alexander B. 1992. "The Study of African Rhythm as a Model for Understanding Rhythm in Two Representative Twentieth-Century American Works". DMA. diss. Urbana: University of Illinois at Urbana-Champaign.
 Rao, Nancy Yunhwa. 1994. "Elucidating Stylistic Difference in Post-tonal Compositions from a Trichordal Perspective: Commonality and Individual Styles in Selected Compositions of Milton Babbitt, Arnold Schoenberg, Ruth Crawford Seeger, and Elliott Carter". PhD diss. Ann Arbor: University of Michigan.
 Sward, Rosalie La Grow. 1981. "An Examination of the Mathematical Systems Used in Selected Compositions of Milton Babbitt and Iannis Xenakis". Evanston: Northwestern University.
 Wolpe, Stefan. 1984. "On New (and Not-So-New) Music in America", translation and commentary by Austin Clarkson. Journal of Music Theory 28:1–45.
 Zuckerman, Mark. 1976. "On Milton Babbitt's String Quartet No. 2". Perspectives of New Music 14, no. 2/15, no. 1 (Spring–Summer/Fall–Winter): 85–110.

1954 compositions
2